Beretinec is a village and municipality in Croatia in Varaždin County. According to the 2011 census, there are 2,176 inhabitants in the municipality, the overwhelming majority of which are Croats.

References

Municipalities of Croatia
Populated places in Varaždin County